Nyctipolus is a genus of nightjars in the family Caprimulgidae. It contains the following two species, both of which were formerly assigned to the genus Caprimulgus.

References

 
Nightjars
Bird genera